Damien Riat (born 26 February 1997) is a Swiss professional ice hockey winger who is currently playing with Lausanne HC of the National League (NL). Riat was drafted 117th overall by the Washington Capitals in the 2016 NHL Entry Draft.

Playing career
Riat spent the 2014–15 season with Malmö Redhawks junior teams. At the end of the season, he joined his hometown team, Genève-Servette HC on a three-year deal.

Riat made his professional debut with Genève-Servette HC in the 2015–16 season, appearing in 45 National League games this season and putting up 21 points (9 goals). He went on to play three more seasons with Geneva, playing 139 regular season games (59 points) and 13 playoffs games (4 points).

On February 3, 2018, Riat agreed to a two-year contract with EHC Biel beginning from the 2018–19 season.

On March 5, 2020, Riat was signed to a two-year entry-level contract by the Washington Capitals of the National Hockey League (NHL). On August 4, 2020, the Washington Capitals agreed to return Riat on loan to former club Genève-Servette HC for the beginning of the 2020–21 season due to the COVID-19 pandemic delaying the North American season. On January 11, 2021, Riat was suspended for 7 games and fined CHF 6,000 for a hit from behind that sent HC Lugano's Elia Riva head first into the boards on January 8, 2021. Riva left the ice on his skates and was brought to the hospital on a stretcher. On January 27, 2021, with one game remaining on his suspension, Riat was reassigned to the Hershey Bears of the AHL for the start of the shortened season.

On August 12, 2021, Riat joined Lausanne HC for the 2021–22 season, on loan from the Washington Capitals. In 35 regular season games with Lausanne, Riat collected 11 goals and 28 points. Following a first-round defeat in the post-season, Riat was signed to a two-year contract extension to remain with Lausanne on 22 April 2022.

International play

Riat was named to Switzerland's under-20 team for the 2016 IIHF World Junior Championships in Helsinki, Finland. He played 6 games with the team, putting up 2 goals and 2 assists. Riat also made the team for the 2017 IIHF World Junior Championships in Montreal, Quebec, Canada. He appeared in 5 games and scored 1 goal and 5 assists.

Riat made his IIHF World Championship debut in 2018 and won silver with Switzerland. He made the trip to Bratislava, Slovakia for the 2019 IIHF World Championship with team Switzerland and was a healthy scratch for the first two games before being sent back home to make room for Sven Andrighetto.

Personal life
Riat is the older brother of HC Sierre's player, Arnaud Riat.

Career statistics

Regular season and playoffs

International

References

External links

1997 births
Living people
EHC Biel players
Genève-Servette HC players
Hershey Bears players
Lausanne HC players
Malmö Redhawks players
Ice hockey people from Geneva
Swiss ice hockey forwards
Washington Capitals draft picks